James Roosevelt I (July 16, 1828 – December 8, 1900), known as "Squire James", was an American businessman, politician, horse breeder, and the father of Franklin D. Roosevelt, 32nd president of the United States.

Early life
Roosevelt was born on July 16, 1828 in Hyde Park, New York to businessman Isaac Daniel Roosevelt and Mary Rebecca Aspinwall, sister of William Henry Aspinwall, both half-first cousins of First Lady Elizabeth Monroe. Isaac's parents were businessman and politician Jacobus Roosevelt III and Catherine Welles. James' maternal grandparents were John Aspinwall and Susan Howland.

In 1847, James Roosevelt graduated from Union College in Schenectady, New York.

Career
After obtaining a law degree from Harvard University, Roosevelt joined the law firm of Benjamin D. Silliman, the latter arranging Roosevelt serve on the founding board of directors to the company's client, the Consolidated Coal Company of Maryland. Doug Wead wrote that Roosevelt applied the skills he learned from watching the growth of this company to his own enterprise.

Roosevelt's business interests were primarily in coal and transportation. He was vice president of the Delaware and Hudson Railway and president of the Southern Railway Security Company.

During an 1853 trip to London shortly after his marriage, Roosevelt called upon United States Minister to the United Kingdom James Buchanan and accepted an invitation by Buchanan to serve as the minister's secretary at the embassy. Conrad Black wrote that this began the tradition of members of the Hyde Park Roosevelt family being affiliated with Democratic presidents.

Following the 1863 death of his father, Roosevelt inherited both his wealth and status as patriarch of the family. Roosevelt purchased an estate that he bestowed the name "Springwood". In 1871, Roosevelt was elected town supervisor of Hyde Park and was pursued as a potential candidate for the New York state assembly or senate or Congress, requests that he turned down despite having an interest in politics.

In the 1880s, Roosevelt donated to the New York gubernatorial campaign of Grover Cleveland and Cleveland's presidential campaign two years later. After the 1884 United States presidential election, in which Cleveland was elected president, the Roosevelt family regularly met with the Clevelands in visits to the White House. Roosevelt was seen by the press as a possible appointee for a diplomatic post within the Cleveland administration, though he turned down these rumors. Roosevelt did contribute to his eldest son James being appointed to the post of First Secretary of the United States Legation in Vienna.

Personal life
Following graduation from Union College in 1847, Roosevelt traveled through Western Europe and the Holy Land before matriculating at Harvard Law School in 1849. In 1853, he married his second cousin, Rebecca Brien Howland, the sister of Meredith Howland. They had one son the next year, James Roosevelt "Rosey" Roosevelt, who married Helen Schermerhorn Astor. 1875 saw Rebecca's health falter as she demonstrated symptoms of heart disease and she was advised by doctors to stop climbing stairs, leading James to install elevators for her to use in both Springwood and their New York home. In August 1876, the couple traveled on James' yacht for a cruise to Long Island Sound, during which Rebecca experienced a massive heart attack when the pair were underway and died a short time afterward.

Four years after Rebecca's death, he met a sixth cousin named Sara Ann Delano, daughter of merchant Warren Delano Jr., at a party celebrating the graduation of his distant cousin Theodore Roosevelt Jr. from Harvard University. James and Sara were married on October 7, 1880, and became the parents of Franklin Delano Roosevelt in 1882, who married Eleanor Roosevelt. James reportedly was a caring father to Franklin, but his recurring heart problems eventually made him an invalid. Franklin reacted by becoming fiercely protective of his father.

By the autumn of 1900, Roosevelt's health declined further after his yacht exploded and sank. The exploits of his grandson Tadd, which included dropping out of Harvard prior to a disappearance that was proceeded by mocking from the press, also served to disillusion James. James died twenty years after he married Sara and left the bulk of his estate to her, and a modest inheritance to Franklin. He is buried at the churchyard at St. James Episcopal Church in Hyde Park; his grave is flanked by those of his wives.

In popular culture
Roosevelt is voiced by John Lithgow in The Roosevelts, a 2014 documentary series by Ken Burns.

Roosevelt is portrayed in passing in The Gilded Age, created by Julian Fellowes.

Legacy

In 1927 Franklin and Sara Roosevelt donated money to the town of Hyde Park for the construction of a new library, named after James, and still in use today.

See also

References

External links

1828 births
1900 deaths
19th-century American businesspeople
People from Hyde Park, New York
James
New York (state) Democrats
Fathers of presidents of the United States
American people of Dutch descent
American people of English descent
Union College (New York) alumni
Harvard Law School alumni
Howland family